Quantitative systems pharmacology (QSP) is a discipline within biomedical research that uses mathematical computer models to characterize biological systems, disease processes and drug pharmacology. QSP can be viewed as a sub-discipline of pharmacometrics that focuses on modeling the mechanisms of drug pharmacokinetics (PK), pharmacodynamics (PD), and disease processes using a systems pharmacology point of view.  QSP models are typically defined by systems of ordinary differential equations (ODE) that depict the dynamical properties of the interaction between the drug and the biological system.

QSP can be used to generate biological/pharmacological hypotheses in silico to aid in the design of in vitro or in vivo non-clinical and clinical experiments.  This can help to guide biomedical experiments so that they yield more meaningful data.  QSP is increasingly being used for this purpose in pharmaceutical research & development to help guide the discovery and development of new therapies. QSP has been used by the FDA in a clinical pharmacology review.

References

External links
QSP Special Interest Group at ISoP
QSP as Simulations Plus
QSP at Certara
eBook: The Emerging Discipline of Quantitative Systems Pharmacology
The UK QSP Network

Pharmacology